The 2015 Tim Hortons Brier was held from February 28 to March 8 at Scotiabank Saddledome in Calgary, Alberta, Canada. 

In the final, the team of Pat Simmons, John Morris, Carter Rycroft and Nolan Thiessen, representing "Team Canada" as defending Brier champions defeated the reigning Olympic gold medallist Brad Jacobs rink, representing Northern Ontario. Simmons had to make a draw to the button in an extra end to win the championship. With the victory, the Simmons rink went on to represent Canada at the 2015 Ford World Men's Curling Championship in Halifax, where they won the bronze medal.

Changes to competition format
For the first time, the event was expanded to include an entry from Nunavut, which has previously not participated in the Brier. Another notable change was having separate entries for the Yukon and Northwest Territories, which had historically competed as a single entry.

Starting with the 2015 tournament, the top ten teams automatically qualified to the main tournament, which was a competition between twelve teams as in years past. An eleventh team was the defending champions from the previous Brier who played as Team Canada. The four remaining unqualified teams played in a pre-qualifying tournament to determine the twelfth team to play in the main tournament.

It was the first time in the history of the Brier that a Team Canada partook, which essentially allowed the defending champions direct re-entry into the event. The skip of the previous year's winning team, Kevin Koe, formed a new team in the off-season and was not be part of Team Canada. Koe won the 2015 Boston Pizza Cup with his new team and represented Alberta at the 2015 Brier. Koe's former teammates recruited John Morris to skip the first ever edition of Team Canada at the Brier. Morris was the runner-up from the previous year.

Similar changes were also implemented for the 2015 Scotties Tournament of Hearts, meaning that for the first time the Canadian men's and women's curling championships will be conducted using identical formats. Previous versions of the Scotties Tournament of Hearts differed from the Brier in that they included a Team Canada entry, but did not include a separate entry from Northern Ontario.

Teams
The teams are listed as follows:

CTRS ranking
The #1 ranked Mike McEwen rink lost in the Manitoba final.

Relegation playoff

Combined record of each province/territory from 2012 to 2014

Nunavut declined to send a team while Prince Edward Island, Nova Scotia, and the Yukon played a single round-robin at the Scotiabank Saddledome in order to determine which one of the three teams would qualify for the tournament. The teams with the two best records were to advance to the play-in game which was contested Saturday, February 28, concurrent with the opening draw of the Brier round-robin. However, each team finished the round robin tied with a 1-1 record which saw Nova Scotia eliminated based on pregame draws to the button. Prince Edward Island then defeated the Yukon to advance to the main draw of the tournament.

Round-robin standings

Round-robin results
All draw times are listed in Mountain Standard Time (UTC−7).

Draw 1
Thursday, February 26, 7:00 pm

Draw 2
Friday, February 27, 8:00 am

Draw 3
Friday, February 27, 3:30 pm

Pre-qualifying final
Saturday, February 28, 1:30 pm

Round-robin standings
Final round-robin standings

Round-robin results
All draw times are listed in Mountain Standard Time (UTC−7).

Draw 1
Saturday, February 28, 1:30 pm

Draw 2
Saturday, February 28, 6:30 pm

Draw 3
Sunday, March 1, 8:30 am

Draw 4
Sunday, March 1, 1:30 pm

Draw 5
Sunday, March 1, 6:30 pm

Draw 6
Monday, March 2, 1:30 pm

Draw 7
Monday, March 2, 6:30 pm

Draw 8
Tuesday, March 3, 8:30 am

Draw 9
Tuesday, March 3, 1:30 pm

Draw 10
Tuesday, March 3, 6:30 pm

Draw 11
Wednesday, March 4, 8:30 am

Draw 12
Wednesday, March 4, 1:30 pm

Draw 13
Wednesday, March 4, 6:30 pm

Draw 14
Thursday, March 5, 8:30 am

Draw 15
Thursday, March 5, 1:30 pm

Draw 16
Thursday, March 5, 6:30 pm

Draw 17
Friday, March 6, 8:30 am

Playoffs

1 vs. 2
Friday, March 6, 6:30 pm

3 vs. 4
Saturday, March 7, 1:00 pm

Semifinal
Saturday, March 7, 6:00 pm

Bronze medal game
Sunday, March 8, 9:30 am

Final
The 2015 Brier final was the first Brier final to start with four blanks. This game came down to the final stone of the eleventh end, where Pat Simmons had a draw to the pin for the win.

Sunday, March 8, 5:00 pm

Statistics

Top 5 player percentages
Round Robin only

Perfect games

Awards
The awards and all-star teams are listed as follows:

All-Star Teams
First Team
Skip:  Brad Jacobs, Northern Ontario
Third:  Ryan Fry, Northern Ontario
Second:  Carter Rycroft, Team Canada
Lead:  Colin Hodgson, Manitoba

Second Team
Skip:  Brad Gushue, Newfoundland and Labrador
Third:  Marc Kennedy, Alberta
Second:  Brent Laing, Alberta
Lead:  Ben Hebert, Alberta

Ross Harstone Sportsmanship Award
 Jim Cotter, British Columbia skip

Paul McLean Award
Jim Young, longtime camera man for TSN's curling broadcasts

Hec Gervais Most Valuable Player Award
 Pat Simmons, Team Canada skip

Notes

References

External links

 
Sport in Calgary
Curling in Alberta
The Brier
Tim Hortons Brier
Tim Hortons Brier
Tim Hortons Brier
Tim Hortons Brier